Andrea Jardi Cuadrado (born March 13, 1990) is an alpine skier from Spain.  She competed for Spain at the 2010 Winter Olympics.  She did not complete any of the events she competed in.

Notes

References

External links
 
 
 
 

1990 births
Living people
Spanish female alpine skiers
Olympic alpine skiers of Spain
Alpine skiers at the 2010 Winter Olympics